The Libertarian Party of Canada fielded eleven candidates in the 2006 federal election, none of whom were elected.  Information about these candidates may be found here.

Ontario

Soumen Deb (Don Valley West)

Deb was born in Toronto in 1976, and attended Don Valley Collegiate and Queen's University. He was the Libertarian Party's candidate in Don Valley West in the 2006 federal election and is standing for the party again in the September 22, 2008 federal by-election.

He is a logistics coordinator, and an advocate of personal, economic and commercial freedom.  In the 2006 campaign, he wrote that he supports preserving the environment through "market forces and grassroots action".

He campaigned for Mayor of Toronto in the 2006 municipal election, saying that he would "raise awareness for the state of individual freedom and liberty" and "expose government in its current format as bad for this society".

Marty Gobin (Whitby—Oshawa)

Gobin received 274 votes (0.4%), finishing fifth against Conservative candidate Jim Flaherty.

Footnotes

Candidates in the 2006 Canadian federal election
2006